The Men's 60 metres event  at the 2009 European Athletics Indoor Championships was held on March 7–8.

Medalists

Results

Heats
First 2 of each heat (Q) and the next 6 fastest (q) qualified for the semifinals.

Semifinals

First 4 of each semifinals qualified directly (Q) for the final.

Final

References
Results

60 metres at the European Athletics Indoor Championships
2009 European Athletics Indoor Championships